Leucauge decorata, the decorative silver orb spider, is one of the long-jawed orb weaver spiders. 
A medium to large sized orb weaving spider, with a body length up to 12 mm long (female). Male to 6 mm. This species has a "point" to the end of the abdomen. Found in Africa, India, south east Asia, also to Australia.

References

decorata
Spiders described in 1842
Spiders of Australia
Spiders of Asia
Spiders of Africa
Spiders of the Indian subcontinent